WCX may refer to:
 West Coast Infrastructure Exchange, a partnership between the three states on the west coast of the United States and British Columbia
 Station code for Wembley Stadium railway station in London
 Former callsign of WJR,  a radio station broadcasting from Detroit in the United States